Die Wacht ('The Guard') was a Volga German communist newspaper, which appeared around 1918 as a sister publication of Nachrichten. Die Wacht ceased publication in June 1919.

References

German-language communist newspapers
Newspapers published in Russia
Publications established in 1918
1919 establishments in Russia